Pascal Gnazzo (5 November 1920 – 28 August 2019) was a French racing cyclist. He rode in the 1947 Tour de France.

References

External links
 

1920 births
2019 deaths
French male cyclists
Cyclists from Marseille